Gates County Schools is a PK–12 graded school district serving Gates County, North Carolina. Its five schools serve 1,872 students as of the 2010–11 school year.

Student demographics
For the 2010–11 school year, Gates County Schools had a total population of 1,872 students and 148.00 teachers on a (FTE) basis. This produced a student-teacher ratio of 12.65:1. That same year, out of the student total, the gender ratio was 50% male to 50% female. The demographic group makeup was: White, 59%; Black, 36%; Hispanic, 1%; American Indian, 0%; and Asian/Pacific Islander, 0% (two or more races: 3%). For the same school year, 52.38% of the students received free and reduced-cost lunches.

Governance
The primary governing body of Gates County Schools follows a council–manager government format with a five-member Board of Education appointing a Superintendent to run the day-to-day operations of the system. The school system currently resides in the North Carolina State Board of Education's First District.

Board of Education
The five members of the Board of Education generally meet on the first Monday of each month. The current members of the board are: G. Douglas Lilley (Chair), Glendale P. Boone (Vice-Chair, Leslie S. Byrum, Ray Felton, and Claire R. Whitehurst.

Superintendent
The current superintendent of the system is Barry Williams. He took over as superintendent in January, 2012, from the interim superintendent Earl Norfleet. Williams was originally from Appalachia, Virginia, but was most recently superintendent of the Rangely School District RE-4 in Rangely, Colorado.

Member schools
Gates County Schools has five schools ranging from pre-kindergarten to twelfth grade. Those five schools are separated into one high schools, one middle school, and three elementary schools.

High schools
 Gates County Senior High School (Gatesville)

Middle schools
 Central Middle School (Gatesville)

Elementary schools
 Buckland Elementary School (Gates)
 Gatesville Elementary School (Gatesville)
 T. S. Cooper Elementary School (Sunbury)

Awards
The Gates County Schools system has had one school listed as  a Blue Ribbon School: Gatesville Elementary School (1986–87).

See also
List of school districts in North Carolina

References

External links
 

Education in Gates County, North Carolina
School districts in North Carolina